Kakao Entertainment Corp., stylized as kakao ENTERTAINMENT, is a South Korean entertainment, mass media, and publishing company founded in 2021. A subsidiary of the internet company Kakao, it was established subsequent to the merger of the latter's two subsidiaries KakaoPage and Kakao M.

History

KakaoPage Corp.

Podotree Co, Ltd. was founded on July 20, 2010, as a subsidiary of Kakao, and launched KakaoPage three years later. On August 1, 2018, the company changed its corporate name to KakaoPage Corp.

Kakao M

In 2005, the company was acquired by SK Telecom and relaunched as LOEN Entertainment, Inc. three years later, before being sold to Star Invest Holdings (a subsidiary of Affinity Equity Partners).

In January 2016, it was taken over by Kakao and renamed again as Kakao M Corp. in December 2017.

In October 2020, the company expanded in Asia by launching a Thailand-based subsidiary called Kakao M Asia (Private) Co., Ltd. (currently Kakao Entertainment Asia Co., Ltd.).

Merger as Kakao Entertainment (2021–present)

In December 2020, KakaoPage Corp. proposed a merger with Kakao M Corp. as a unified company. It was seen as an action by their parent company against US-based Google’s new policy for its app market place users, which would've affected Kakao M, which KakaoTV platform was starting to become popular in South Korea.

Both companies announced the plans and timeline for their merger, as well as the proposed name for the unified company Kakao Entertainment Corp on January 25, 2021. Under the plans, KakaoPage Corp. is the surviving entity.

The merger was completed on March 1, and Kakao Entertainment was formally founded a day later.

On July 15, it was announced that Kakao Entertainment and Melon Company would be merging, with the merger expected to be complete in September 2021.

On September 17, Kakao Entertainment announced that Play M Entertainment and Cre.ker Entertainment would be merging in the future.  On November 12, it was announced that the company's new corporate name would be IST Entertainment, which took effect on November 1.

Divisions

Page Company
Headed by co-CEO Joy Lee, the Kakao Entertainment's Page Company is in charge of the company's web fiction publishing and web development business. It is situated in Pangyo, Seongnam in Gyeonggi Province.

M Company
Headed by co-CEO  - one of South Korea's most renowned entertainment executives - the Kakao Entertainment's M Company is in charge of the company's entertainment and mass media business. Its headquarters is in Teheran-ro, Gangnam-gu in Seoul.

Subsidiaries

Under the Page Company
AdPage
Daon Creative
KW Books
Kiwi Media Company
RS Media
Radish Media
Samyang C&C
Soundist Entertainment
Tapas Media
Yeondam

Under the M Company
Antenna Music
Awesome ENT
Baram Pictures
BH Entertainment
Bluedot Entertainment
Dolphiners Films (subject to Korean government approval)
EDAM Entertainment
Flex M
GRAYGO
Maison de Baja
High Up Entertainment
IST Entertainment
J.Wide Company
Kakao Entertainment Asia
Path Mobile (Indonesia)
Studio Orange (Thailand)
Studio Phoenix (Thailand, unrelated to the JTBC Studios subsidiary)
Kross Pictures
Logos Film
Management SOOP
Mega Monster
Moonlight Film
 Ready Entertainment
Sanai Pictures
Starship Entertainment
 Starship X
 Highline Entertainment
 King Kong by Starship
 Shownote
Story & Pictures Media
Studio K11O (subject to Korean government approval)
 VAST Entertainment & Media
 Zip Cinema

Assets

Buildings
 Jungsuck Building (Seoul) - headquarters of the Kakao Entertainment M Company
 The Kakao Entertainment M Company also owns a building at Samseong-dong in Seoul, where the headquarters of IST Entertainment and Flex M are located.

Internet properties
1theK 
 1theK Originals
 1theK Style (coming soon)
 KakaoPage
 KakaoPage Indonesia (formerly Neobazar) (Indonesia)
 KakaoTV
 Kakao Webtoon
 Kakao Webtoon (South Korea) (formerly Daum Webtoon)
 Kakao Webtoon (Indonesia, coming soon)
 Kakao Webtoon (Taiwan)
 Kakao Webtoon (Thailand)
 Melon
 Muse (mobile audition application)
 Radish (US)
 Wuxiaworld (US, acquisition subject to government approval)
 Tapas (US)

Locations
 Kakao Entertainment Page Company: Twosun World Building 8/F, 221, Pangyoyeok-ro, Bundang-gu, Seongnam-si, Gyeonggi-do, South Korea   
 Kakao Entertainment M Company: Jungsuck Building, 17, Teheran-ro 103-gil, Gangnam-gu, Seoul, South Korea

See also
 Kakao

Notes

References

External links
  
  
  
 

Mass media companies established in 2021
Entertainment companies of South Korea
Mass media companies of South Korea
Publishing companies of South Korea
Entertainment
South Korean companies established in 2021
Companies based in Gyeonggi Province
Companies based in Seoul
South Korean record labels
Record label distributors